Gourdou-Leseurre was a French aircraft manufacturer whose founders were Charles Edouard Pierre Gourdou and Jean Adolphe Leseurre.

History
Engineers Jean Leseurre and his brother-in-law Charles Gourdou founded the Établissements Gourdou-Leseurre in Saint Maur-des-Fossés, southeast of Paris in 1921. The factory assembled military aircraft under license, such as the Breguet 14, until Gourdou and Leseurre began building their own aircraft as main designers.

Between 1925 and 1928, Gourdou-Leseurre was taken over by the Ateliers et Chantiers de la Loire shipyard, together with Loire and Loire-Nieuport. The aircraft produced at that time by the Gourdou-Leseurre company were known as 'Loire-Gourdou', carrying the LGL denomination instead of GL.

In the 1930s strong disagreements developed between Charles Gourdou and Jean Adolphe Leseurre. This eventually  led to a break-up of their professional relationship and the demise of the company in 1934.

Aircraft
The company was active until 1934, producing mostly light military aircraft and seaplanes.
 Gourdou-Leseurre Type A
 Gourdou-Leseurre Type B
 Gourdou-Leseurre GL.21
 Gourdou-Leseurre GL.22
 Gourdou-Leseurre GL.23
 Gourdou-Leseurre GL.30
 Gourdou-Leseurre GL.31
 Gourdou-Leseurre LGL.32
 Gourdou-Leseurre GL-33
 Gourdou-Leseurre GL-341
 Gourdou-Leseurre GL-351
 Gourdou-Leseurre GL-40
 Gourdou-Leseurre GL-430
 Gourdou-Leseurre GL-432
 Gourdou-Leseurre GL-450
 Gourdou-Leseurre GL-482
 Gourdou-Leseurre GL-50
 Gourdou-Leseurre GL-51
 Gourdou-Leseurre GL-521
 Gourdou-Leseurre GL-633
 Gourdou-Leseurre GL-810 HY
 Gourdou-Leseurre GL-811 HY
 Gourdou-Leseurre GL-812 HY
 Gourdou-Leseurre GL-813 HY
 Gourdou-Leseurre GL-820 HY
 Gourdou-Leseurre GL-821 HY
 Gourdou-Leseurre GL-821 HY 02
 Gourdou-Leseurre GL-831 HY
 Gourdou-Leseurre GL-832 HY

References

External links

Jérôme Cavalli, pilote d'essais du constructeur aéronautique Gourdou Leseurre

 
Defunct aircraft manufacturers of France
Vehicle manufacturing companies established in 1917
Vehicle manufacturing companies disestablished in 1934
1917 establishments in France
1934 disestablishments in France